Austromitra arnoldi is a species of small sea snail, marine gastropod mollusc in the family Costellariidae, the ribbed miters.

References

 Verco, J.C. 1909. Notes on South Australian marine Mollusca with descriptions of new species. Part XII. Transactions of the Royal Society of South Australia 33: 293–342

arnoldi
Gastropods described in 1909